The 1982–83 Sussex County Football League season was the 58th in the history of Sussex County Football League a football competition in England. It also was the last season for the league to consist of two divisions.

Division One

Division One featured 14 clubs which competed in the division last season, along with two new clubs, promoted from Division Two:
Midhurst & Easebourne
Wick

League table

Division Two

Division Two featured 14 clubs which competed in the division last season, along with two new clubs, relegated from Division One:
Horsham YMCA
Shoreham

League table

References

1982-83
1982–83 in English football leagues